David Gijsbert van der Linden (22 June 1915 – 30 January 1999), known as Dolf van der Linden, was a Dutch conductor of popular music with a reputation which extended beyond the borders of the Netherlands.

Biography
David Gijsbert van der Linden, the son of a salesman of musical instruments, was born in Vlaardingen, near Rotterdam. Before World War II, he played in some different bands as a pianist and tried his hand at arranging music for these bands. His colleagues started calling him "Dolf", because he reminded them of a former colleague with that name.

In 1945, he was asked by Dutch authorities who had arrived back from their exile in London to form an orchestra for light music. Picking musicians he knew from all over the Netherlands, he thus managed to create the Metropole Orchestra. Famous names from these early years were Benny Behr, Sem Nijveen (both violinists), Kees Verschoor (clarinetist) and Manny Oets (pianist).

In 1957, van der Linden conducted the winning Dutch entry to the Eurovision Song Contest, "Net als toen", sung by Corry Brokken. In the year after, he and his orchestra accompanied the Eurovision Song Contest which was organised by Dutch TV in Hilversum. Afterwards, he was asked by, amongst others, the BBC to do some work for them. All in all, between 1957 and 1971, van der Linden conducted 13 Dutch Eurovision entries, amongst which two winners (in 1957 and 1959 - the latter song, "Een beetje", written by the pianist of his orchestra, Dick Schallies).

In 1969 he refused to go to the Eurovision Song Contest in Spain, claiming that Francoist Spain reminded him too much of his experiences in World War II. Frans de Kok stepped in and was lucky enough to accompany what turned out to be another winning entry, "De troubadour" by Lenny Kuhr. In the 1970 contest in Amsterdam, van der Linden was asked by RTÉ to step in and conduct "All Kinds of Everything" by Dana, another winner.

In the 1970s, Dolf van der Linden tried to rejuvenate and modernise his orchestra. In 1980, he retired and his successor as chief conductor of the Metropole Orchestra was Rogier van Otterloo. In 1995 he was awarded a Golden Harp for his outstanding achievements for entertainment music in the Netherlands; at the ceremony, he conducted the Metropole Orchestra for the last time. In 1999, van der Linden died in Hilversum.

On 22 June 2015, which would have been van der Linden's 100th birthday, the Metropole Orchestra played a concert of his compositions and arrangements. At this occasion, the first copy of van der Linden's biography, written by Bas Tukker, was presented to Dolf's younger brother Rob.

References

1915 births
1999 deaths
Dutch conductors (music)
Male conductors (music)
Eurovision Song Contest conductors
People from Vlaardingen
20th-century conductors (music)
20th-century Dutch male musicians